Casco Bay High School is a public high school in Portland, Maine, United States. Casco Bay High School describes itself as an Expeditionary Learning educational experience, which the school describes as being based on the Outward Bound learning system.

Since the 2005–06 school year, the school has shared a facility with Portland Arts and Technology High School on Allen Avenue, in the city's North Deering neighborhood. Casco Bay is one of three public high schools within Portland Public Schools, the other two being Portland High School and Deering High School. Unlike the other two high schools, however, enrollment at Casco Bay is only open by a lottery.

Opening in 2005, Casco Bay High made Portland the first city in the United States to offer Expeditionary Learning from kindergarten to 12th grade. Every year after, Casco Bay added a grade level, with 70 students per grade, and the school now has all grade levels attending (9-12) with 100 students per grade. The school has won numerous awards, and in 2012 was named the 8th best high school in Maine, and in 2018, it was named one of Maine’s top high schools by U.S. News & World Report, and the #5 high school in Maine by Niche.com in 2019. 98% of its graduates have been accepted to college. It is also one of the few high schools in Maine to offer Independent Study courses to Junior and Senior students. These are student-designed courses that can range from a study of 19th-century Literature to an exploration of Quantum Mechanics.

Casco Bay High School enrolls up to a maximum of 400 students per year, currently serving 391.

Crew 
Every student at Casco Bay High School is assigned to peer groups known as crews  designed to facilitate inclusivity and faculty mentor relationships. The students stay in the same crew for all four years (however, not necessarily retaining the same faculty advisor). A crew is a group of 10 to 15 students and one faculty member. Activities are held within the crew  every day of the week. Crews in the freshman and senior grades are sent on a 3-night, 4-day Rippleffect mini-expedition. For that week, students will kayak in Casco Bay in order to get to know their crew members. Many students feel that the experience is a very positive one. Active members on this trip receive 0.5 credits for physical education.

Junior Journey
An integral part of a student's experience at Casco Bay High School is their Junior Journey. Each year, the entire junior class is given the opportunity to plan a class trip to a location where one can experience a new culture and service learning. To date, all Junior Journeys have been executed in association with Habitat for Humanity in Biloxi, Mississippi, Almost Heaven, West Virginia, and Rockaway, New York. During the trip, which is entirely funded by the students' own fundraising efforts, the junior class spends time volunteering, team building and bonding, and taking in local culture, history, and landmarks. Participation in Junior Journey bears 0.5 elective credits.

Administration
Derek Pierce has been the school's principal since it opened in 2005. In 2014, he won Nellie Mae's Larry O'Toole Award for exhibiting "great leadership through innovation or courage in moving student-centered approaches to learning forward". CBHS received $100,000 as a result. Two years later in 2016, Pierce was named Maine Principal of the Year by the Maine Principal's Association.

References

External links
Official Website

Public high schools in Maine
Schools in Portland, Maine
Educational institutions established in 2005
2005 establishments in Maine
High schools in Cumberland County, Maine